The SNCF Class CC 6500 is a class of 1.5 kV DC electric locomotives. Among the trains they hauled in their first years of service were the SNCF flagship train Le Mistral and Trans Europ Express trains Aquitaine, Le Capitole and l'Étendard.

Technical details
The locomotives had 3-axle monomotor bogies with each set of 3 axles coupled by gears. Speed regulation was by rheostats and series-parallel control. The motors had double armatures so there were four "demi-motors" which allowed three motor groupings: full series, series-parallel and full parallel. The power controller had 28 steps.

The second batch of CC 6500 locomotives were equipped with third-rail electrical pickups for use on the steeply-graded Maurienne line in the Alps, which were removed when the line was converted to overhead catenary supplies.

Production
Between 1969 and 1976 a total of 74 were built, with the last of this class taken out of service in 2007.
Four more were built as dual-system 1.5 kV DC/25 kV AC locomotives, and designated Class CC 21000. These were reconfigured for use as DC only locomotives between 1995 and 1996 , taking the total of CC 6500 locomotives to 78.

Names
Around half the class received names. Most are named after French towns, except CC 6572, which was named to commemorate the World War II railway workers resistance group, Résistance-Fer.

References

Further reading
 

06500
C′C′ locomotives
Alstom locomotives
MTE locomotives
Standard gauge electric locomotives of France
1500 V DC locomotives
Railway locomotives introduced in 1969
Passenger locomotives